William Hemingway (July 19, 1869 - November 5, 1937) was the mayor of Jackson, Mississippi, from 1901 to 1905, and a member of the Mississippi House of Representatives in 1920. He was a Democrat.

Biography 
Hemingway was born on July 19, 1869, in Teoc, Carroll County, Mississippi, to Colonel William Linn Hemingway and Mary Elizabeth McCain Hemingway. He graduated from the University of Mississippi in 1889, and was admitted to the bar in 1897. He was the Jackson city attorney from 1909 to 1921. He was elected to the Mississippi House of Representatives to represent Hinds County in 1920, but he resigned soon after election to be the state's Assistant Attorney General. He died on November 5, 1937.

Personal life 
Hemingway married Grace Hyer in 1901. Her father, William Fisk Hyer, was a member of the Mississippi Legislature in 1871. William and Grace had several children, but all of them died in infancy.

References 

1869 births
1937 deaths
People from Carroll County, Mississippi
Mayors of Jackson, Mississippi

Members of the Mississippi House of Representatives
Mississippi lawyers